Baron Hamilton may refer to several peerage titles.

Baron Hamilton of Strabane in the County of Tyrone (1617)
Baron Hamilton of Glenawly (1660) 
Baron Hamilton of Stackallen in the County of Meath (1715)
Baron Hamilton of Hameldon in the County of Leicester (1776) 
Baron Hamilton of Wishaw in the County of Lanark (1831)
Baron Hamilton of Dalzell in the county of Lanark (1886) 
Baron Hamilton of Epsom in the County of Devon (2005)
Baron Hamilton of Hageby in Sweden